Spraint is the dung of the otter.

Spraints are typically identified by smell and are known for their distinct odors, the smell of which has been described as ranging from freshly mown hay to putrefied fish. They contain scales, shells and bones of water creatures. Because of the decline of otters in Britain, several surveys have been made to record the distribution of the animal, usually by recording the presence of spraint.

References

Further reading 
 
 

Feces